State Highway 36 (abbreviated SH-36 or OK-36) is a state highway in Oklahoma. It passes through Cotton Co., Tillman Co., and Comanche Co. It currently has no lettered spur routes. State Highway 36 was first added to the highway system around 1926.

Route description
State Highway 36 begins at Exit 1 on Interstate 44, the first exit north of the Red River on I-44. From this interchange, Highway 36 heads due north to meet US-70. SH-36 turns west to follow US-70, forming a concurrency. The two highways angle northwest to begin paralleling a railroad line. SH-36 and US-70 pass just south of Devol. Approximately  thereafter, the two cross the Cotton–Tillman County line.

After  concurrent with US-70, SH-36 splits away from the U.S. route on the northeast side of Grandfield. As before, SH-36 heads due north from there, crossing over Deep Red Creek and some of its local tributaries. After about  alone, the highway forms another concurrency, this time with State Highway 5. The two highways pass to the east of Chattanooga Sky Harbor Airport. After  together, SH-5 splits off to the west. SH-36 continues north for around  before curving to the east, toward Chattanooga.

As Highway 36 crosses into Comanche County, it also enters the town of Chattanooga, which it passes through on 3rd Street. Leaving town, the route continues due east, then curves towards the northeast, crossing Spring Creek. SH-36 next runs through Faxon, continuing northeast; after leaving the town, it bridges West Cache Creek. The highway then resumes a due east course and continues for nearly  before reuniting with I-44. At this interchange, the SH-36 designation ends. The roadbed continues east through the interchange; a motorist continuing straight will then be on southbound US-277/US-281 towards Geronimo.

History
State Highway 36 first appears on the 1927 state highway map, implying that it was added to the system sometime between May 1, 1926, the date of the prior map, and November 1, 1927. The 1927 map shows SH-36 crossing the Red River at a bridge due south of Grandfield. From the bridge, the highway heads north to Grandfield and continues from there along its approximate present-day route. It ended at SH-8 south of Lawton.

Between July 1, 1928 and January 1, 1929, the southernmost portion of SH-36 was rerouted. The segment of highway between Grandfield and the Red River bridge south of town was removed from the state highway system; instead, SH-36 was rerouted to the east, serving Devol and ending at US-70 west of Randlett, where US-70 turned south to cross the river north of Burkburnett, Texas. Between August 1933 and February 1934, US-70 was rerouted to follow a more direct path between Randlett and the Texas line. A north–south segment of the old highway was assigned to SH-36—the southernmost  of the present-day highway. On March 3, 1945, US-70 was rerouted to cross into Texas south of Davidson instead, forming the concurrency with SH-36 east of Grandfield.

In 1939, SH-36 was extended to the north. The highway followed US-277/US-281 north to the south side of Lawton. There, the highway split off to head due north along Fort Sill Boulevard through town, coming to an end at the gate of Fort Sill itself. Changes also occurred further south. On September 10, 1951, US-70 and SH-36 were realigned to a new, more direct path between Grandfield and Randlett.

The portion of SH-36 through Lawton to Fort Sill was stripped of its designation in 1978. No major changes have occurred to the highway since then.

SH-36A

SH-36 currently has no lettered spur routes. However, between approximately 1953 and 1978, there was a SH-36A in Lawton. At its greatest extent, it connected the Cameron University campus to present-day I-44.

SH-36A had been designated by 1953. At this time, the highway's eastern terminus was at Fort Sill Boulevard (SH-36 at the time). Between 1956 and 1961, the highway was extended east to Business US-281. In 1970, it was extended further, to the Pioneer Expressway (present-day I-44). SH-36A was decommissioned in 1978, likely at the same time the adjoining section of SH-36 was turned over to the City of Lawton.

Junction list

References

External links

SH-36 at Roadklahoma

036
Transportation in Cotton County, Oklahoma
Transportation in Tillman County, Oklahoma
Transportation in Comanche County, Oklahoma